The Half Moon (also known as the Germania and Exen) was a racing sailboat; it sank in 1930 near Miami, Florida, United States. The wreck is outside Bear Cut, which separates Virginia Key from Key Biscayne. Christened Germania, the racing yacht featured a chrome-nickel steel hull built by Krupp-Germania-Werft in 1908 in Kiel, Germany. During a visit to England in 1914, the yacht was seized as a 'war prize'. After changing owners several times, and surviving an especially-violent storm off Virginia, the yacht became a floating restaurant and dance hall off Miami. It sank near Key Biscayne in 1930.
In 2000, the wreck became the seventh Florida Underwater Archaeological Preserve.
In 2001, it was added to the US National Register of Historic Places.

References

External links

 Miami-Dade County listings at National Register of Historic Places
 Half Moon at Florida's Underwater Archaeological Preserves
 Half Moon at Florida Maritime Heritage Trail
 Half Moon at Florida Heritage Tourism Interactive Catalog
 Museums in the Sea Half Moon

1908 ships
Ships built in Kiel
Maritime incidents in 1930
National Register of Historic Places in Miami-Dade County, Florida
Shipwrecks of the Florida coast
Shipwrecks on the National Register of Historic Places in Florida
Florida Underwater Archaeological Preserves